Principal secretary is a post and a rank in state governments of India. The position holder is generally an IAS officer and a government official of high seniority. Principal secretary ranked officers generally are the administrative heads of departments in a state government. The post is equivalent to that of an Additional secretary to Government of India, but they can also be deputed to Government of India in the rank and post of a Joint secretary to Government of India, because of seniority.

Position

Principal secretary in a state government
In the state governments, a principal secretary ranks above a secretary but it is below the designations of additional chief secretary and chief secretary. Principal Secretaries act as administrative heads of the department they are assigned to.

Principal Secretary to the Prime Minister

The post of Principal Secretary to the Prime Minister of India was created during the tenure of Indira Gandhi as prime minister. The Principal Secretary to PM is the head of the Prime Minister's Office. He/she holds the rank and status of Cabinet Secretary to the Government of India. Additionally, some prime ministers also appoint an additional principal secretary, who too holds the rank and status of Cabinet Secretary to the Government of India.

Courts
In Jammu and Kashmir High Court, there is a unique creation of Principal Secretary to the Chief Justice, he is of a senior district and sessions judge rank. He attends matters pertaining to the employees of subordinate judiciary such as appointments, transfers, promotions and leave. He is also ex officio secretary of Public Interest Litigation Cell. He also attends all other matters assigned by the chief justice. He is overall in charge of chief justice's secretariat.

References 

Notes

External links
 PM Officers PMO official website.

Civil Services of India
Indian government officials
State governments of India
Prime Minister's Office (India)
Indian Administrative Service officers